According to the 2012 estimates, there were 100,000 Mennonites living in Mexico (including 32,167 baptized adult church members), the vast majority of them, or about 90,000 are established in the state of Chihuahua, 6,500 were living in Durango, with the rest living in small colonies in the states of Campeche, Tamaulipas, Zacatecas, San Luis Potosí and Quintana Roo.

Their settlements were first established in the 1920s. In 1922, 3,000 Mennonites from the Canadian province of Manitoba established in Chihuahua. By 1927, Mennonites reached 10,000 and they were established in Chihuahua, Durango and Guanajuato.

Worsening poverty, water shortages and drug-related violence across northern Mexico have provoked significant numbers of Mennonites living in Durango and Chihuahua to relocate abroad in recent years, especially to Canada, and to other regions of Latin America. Between 2012 and 2017 alone, it is estimated that at least 30,000 Mexican Mennonites emigrated to Canada.

History

Background
The ancestors of the vast majority of Mexican Mennonites settled in the Russian Empire in the late 18th and 19th centuries, coming from the Vistula delta in West Prussia. Even though these Mennonites are Dutch and Prussian by ancestry, language and custom, they are generally called Russian Mennonites, Russland-Mennoniten in German. In the years after 1873, some 7,000 left the Russian Empire and settled in Canada. In the period leading up to and during World War I,  governments in the Canadian provinces of Manitoba and Saskatchewan passed laws requiring public schools to fly the Union flag, required compulsory attendance, and created public schools in areas of Mennonite settlement. In response the more conservative Mennonites sent out delegates to a number of countries to seek out a new land for settlement. They finally settled in a tract of land in Northern Mexico after negotiating certain privileges with Mexican President Álvaro Obregón. Approximately 6,000 of the most conservative Mennonites eventually left Manitoba and Saskatchewan for Mexico. The first train left Plum Coulee, Manitoba, on March 1, 1922.

Migration
In 1927 some 7,000 Mennonites from Canada lived in Mexico.

After 1924, another 200 Mennonite families (some 1,000 persons) from Soviet Russia, tried to settle in Mexico. But in the end only 6 out of the 200 families from Russia remained in Mexico. Between 1948 and 1952, some 595 persons of the Kleine Gemeinde in Manitoba bought and settled the Quellenkolonie. They were joined by 246 Old Colony settlers from Manitoba and Saskatchewan, but most of these settlers either soon returned to Canada or left the colony.

Settlements 
The Mennonites established farms, machine shops and motorized vehicles for transporting produce (although automobiles were forbidden for common use). Canadian oats, beans and corn were the main produce. The villages followed Mennonite architectural styles existent in Russia and Canada and the names were based in some cases on former names in Germany but in most cases from German names of villages in Russia and Canada such as Rosenort, Steinbach and Schönwiese. The colonies were based on former Mennonite social structures in terms of education, similar prayer houses and unsalaried ministers. Conservative dress and traditional roles for women were the norm.

Demography

Starting with the first 3,000 mennonite colonists in 1922, community's population grew exponentially and in just a 100 year it reached 100,000, or a growth of over 3000%.

Present 
In Chihuahua, Mennonites continue their lifestyle with several reforms, such as the use of automobiles.  They coexist, learning Spanish, and English, alongside their German language,  living side by side with the castizos in the hill country of the state. During the harvest season they employ a considerable number of Tarahumara people from the nearby Copper Canyon area. About 50,000 Mennonites reside near the city of Cuauhtémoc in Chihuahua.
In Durango, there are 32 Mennonite communities (30 in Nuevo Ideal Municipality and 2 in Santiago Papasquiaro Municipality). Mennonites in Durango number reached a top of 8,000 in 2011, now they are 6,500; most of them live in Nuevo Ideal. Once in Nuevo Ideal, it becomes central transit point where the main roads that communicate Northwest and Northeast Durango separate (the road going northwest to Santa Catarina de Tepehuanes is paved while the one going to Escobedo, Durango towards the northeast, is a dirt road). Mennonites benefit from this transit point since many travelers and truck drivers stop in Nuevo Ideal in search of Menonita Cheese.

The largest denomination as of 2006 is Old Colony Mennonite Church with 17,200 members, Kleingemeinde in Mexiko has 2,150 members, Sommerfelder Mennonitengemeinde has 2,043 members, Reinländer-Gemeinde has 1,350 members, and Evangelical Mennonite Mission Conference has 97 members

The community of Chihuahua separates themselves into "conservative" and "liberal", with the liberal faction accounting for 20% of the population. This group is more open to outsiders and as such, more likely to marry outside of the community than their conservative peers. It is also more common for this group to adopt Tarahumara and Mestizo children. These children grow up as any other Mennonite would, learning German in school and helping out in the community.

Since the start of the Mexican Drug War, many Mennonite colonies in Chihuahua have suffered the impact of the drug-related violence. The location of the colonies and the economic success of the Mennonites are the reasons why the community has been affected. The economic achievements have attracted the attention of organized criminal gangs, putting Mennonites at risk of armed robbery, kidnap and extortion. These factors have led Mennonites from northern Mexico to emigrate to other Mennonite settlements in Alberta, Canada, Belize and Paraguay to escape the violence. Thousands have moved and settled in more secure Mexican states like Campeche, or moved to other South American countries like Argentina and Bolivia.

Some Mennonites were, in fact, convicted of drug running in the 1990s. There have been fresh accusations more recently.  In 2014, Abraham Friesen-Remple was one of six members of the Northern Mexico's Mennonite community who were indicted and accused of smuggling marijuana in the gas tanks of cars and inside farm equipment.

As of 2008, Salamanca had a population of 862.

A number of congregations of Conservative Mennonites have been established throughout Mexico including La Esperanza and Pedernales in Chihuahua, La Honda, Zacatecas, and more recently Oaxaca.

In addition to escalating drug-related violence and worsening poverty in Mexico, Mennonites living in Chihuahua and Durango have had to contend with extended periods of droughts as well as tensions with non-Mennonite farmers over access to water. The combination of these factors has provoked significant numbers of Mennonites in the region to emigrate abroad, especially to Canada and South America, in recent years. From 2012 to 2017 alone, it is estimated that 30,000 Mexican Mennonites relocated to Canada. A 2020 survey found that there are more than 200 Mennonite colonies in nine Latin American countries, with 66 in Mexico.

Film
The Mexican Mennonite community was the setting for the 2007 film Stellet Licht by acclaimed Mexican director Carlos Reygadas.

See also 
 Queso Chihuahua
 Mormon colonies in Mexico

Literature
 Harry Leonard Sawatzky: They Sought a Country: Mennonite Colonization in Mexico, Berkeley, CA et al. 1971. 
 Harry Leonard Sawatzky: Sie suchten eine Heimat : deutsch-mennonitische Kolonisierung in Mexiko, 1922 - 1984, Marburg 1986. (Not just a translation of the English book, but a distinct publication)
 Walter Schmiedehaus: Die Altkolonier-Mennoniten in Mexiko, Winnipeg 1982

References

External links
 Mexican Farmers Exploring Tatarstan Agribusiness at The Kazan Herald
 Mexico at Global Anabaptist Mennonite Encyclopedia Online
 Protective Retreat: Mexico's Mennonites Consider a New Migration - The World and I
 "Data for "Pious Pioneers: The expansion of Mennonite colonies in Latin America"", This data is provided in support of the paper "Pious Pioneers: The expansion of Mennonite colonies in Latin America", published in the Journal of Land Use Science, December 15, 2020, 1–17

 

Canadian diaspora in Mexico
German diaspora in North America
 
Russian Mennonite diaspora in Mexico
Ukrainian diaspora in North America